Leighton Graves Osmun (December 13, 1880 – June 12, 1928) was an American screenwriter, playwright, and author who was active during Hollywood's silent era. He often collaborated with fellow screenwriter Beatrice deMille.

Biography 
Leighton was born in Newark, New Jersey, to banker J. Allen Osmun and Mary Graves.

In 1916, while living in Los Angeles and working as a writer, Leighton briefly disappeared after divorcing his first wife, Harriet Scholl, and marrying his second wife, Lula Dix Drummond. He and Lula had a daughter, Sarah, together; she would go on to marry William Ince, son of director Thomas H. Ince.

In the summer of 1929, he suffered a heart attack and died after rescuing a child who was in danger of drowning at a beach in La Jolla, California. He was 48 years old. He was survived by his second wife, Dix, and his daughter, Sarah.

Selected filmography 
East Side - West Side (1923)
The Woman Game (1920)
The Fortune Teller (1920)
The Clutch of Circumstance (1918)
Treasure of the Sea (1918)
The Claim (1918)
The Devil-Stone (1917)
Forbidden Paths (1917)
The Inner Shrine (1917)
The Jaguar's Claws (1917)
Unconquered (1917)
Sacrifice (1917)
Castles for Two (1917)
Betty to the Rescue (1917)
The Years of the Locust (1916)
The Heir to the Hoorah (1916)
The Storm (1916)
Each Pearl a Tear (1916)

References

External links

1880 births
1928 deaths
Writers from Newark, New Jersey
Screenwriters from New Jersey
Silent film screenwriters
20th-century American screenwriters